Albina Mykolaivna Bordunova (born 24 December 1984) is a Ukrainian former swimmer, who specialized in middle-distance freestyle events. She competed for Ukraine, as a 15-year-old teen, in the women's 4×200 m freestyle relay at the 2000 Summer Olympics in Sydney. On the fifth day of prelims, Bordunova and her teammates Zhanna Lozumyrska, Nadiya Beshevli, and Olena Lapunova were disqualified from heat one for an early diving attempt on the lead-off leg.

References

1984 births
Living people
Ukrainian female swimmers
Olympic swimmers of Ukraine
Swimmers at the 2000 Summer Olympics
Ukrainian female freestyle swimmers
Sportspeople from Zaporizhzhia
21st-century Ukrainian women